Chang Hsiao-yen (born 11 August 1948) is a Taiwanese television host and actress. Born in Shanghai, China, Chang relocated to Taiwan after the Chinese Civil War where she started her acting career at the age of five as a child actress in cinema. In 1958, she received her first Best Child Actress award at the Asia Pacific Film Festival, a recognition she earned for three consecutive years and which placed her alongside notable child stars such as Josephine Siao, Lydia Shum, Fung Bo Bo and Connie Chan. Since the 1980s, Chang has become a household name in Taiwan after hosting the CTS variety show Variety 100 (綜藝100) which is one of the most successful shows in the television history of Taiwan. She is also known for her work as the host of highly rated variety shows such as Weekend Pie (週末派), Super Sunday (超級星期天), Million-Dollar Class (百萬小學堂) and SS Hsiao-yen Night (SS小燕之夜).

In addition to her television and film work, Chang co-founded the record label Forward Music (豐華唱片) which launched the singing career of then newcomers A-mei and Tao Ching-Ying. She is also a mentor of television hosts Mickey Huang, Pu Hsueh-liang and Bowie Tsang.

In an annual poll conducted by Reader's Digest in 2015, Chang was voted the most trusted Taiwanese variety show host.

She was formerly the managing director of television channels TVBS Entertainment Channel and Azio TV, and the President of radio network UFO Network Broadcasting (飛碟廣播). She currently serves as the President of artiste management company Grand Pan Communication Co. (大鵬傳播事業有限公司) and Forward Music.

See also 

 Knight of the Sword

References

External links 

 
 

1948 births
Living people
Actresses from Shanghai
Taiwanese child actresses
Taiwanese television actresses
Taiwanese film actresses
20th-century Taiwanese actresses
21st-century Taiwanese actresses
Taiwanese television presenters
Taiwanese businesspeople
Chinese Civil War refugees
Businesspeople from Shanghai
Taiwanese people from Shanghai
Taiwanese women television presenters